The Fire Within is a 1963 French drama film starring Maurice Ronet.

The Fire Within also may refer to:

 The Fire Within (novel), 2001 children's fantasy novel written by Chris d'Lacey in The Last Dragon Chronicles
 Zameer: The Fire Within, a 2005 Bollywood film starring Ajay Devgan, Amisha Patel and Mahima Chaudhry
 The Burning Season (1993 film) (alternatively titled The Fire Within), 1993 film starring Om Puri
 "The Fire Within" (Sliders), an episode of the television series Sliders
 The Fire Within (Don Braden album), a 1999 jazz album by Don Braden
 The Fire Within, various artists (2008, DNA Production)
 The Fire Within, 2009 Ronny Munroe
 The Fire Within, 2008 Raghu Dixit
 The Fire Within, 1995 Gnawa Music of Morocco album by Hassan Hakmoun
 The Fire Within, 1999 solo album by Dante Fox
 "The Fire Within," composition by Brian May and Michael Kamen from the 2002 Winter Olympics, also called "Light the Fire Within" as recorded by LeAnn Rimes, also from the 2002 Winter Olympic Games

See also
 Fire Within (disambiguation)
 "The Fire Within Me", song from Original Cast Recording of the musical Little Women
 The Fire from Within, album by Billy Bang and the Billy Bang Sextet